William Wragg Smith, (18081875) was the son of the U.S. statesman William Loughton Smith. He was a gentleman planter, lawyer, naturalist, translator and poet. He was the second-to-last owner of the Smith-Wragg Plantation, the last being his wife Mary Theresa Hedley Smith and their children, who moved to New York. He was also a founding member of the Elliott Natural History Society; Elliott was a founder of the Smithsonian Institution.

He authored several works, including:
 "The Last Canto of Childe Harold's Pilgrimage, translated and amplified from the French of Alphonse de Lamartine" [and other minor poems] (1842).
 "Autumn Coloring, Fall of the Leaf, Winter Habit of Trees and Shrubs in the Lower Country of South Carolina."
 "Sketch of the Seminole War and Sketches during a Campaign. By a Lieutenant of the Left Wing", which was published anonymously but subsequently attributed to "W.W. Smith" in some cases, and M.M. Cohen in others (some sources suggests the Cohen attribution was a mistake.) This book deals with wartime events, Florida botany, as well as Seminole language and customs.
 "Flora of the Lower Country of South Carolina Reviewed" (1859)

References

External links
25-27 Broad St, a Charleston property built by William Wragg Smith.
 showing Wm Wragg Smith] at his 22 King Street residence in Charleston in 1861.
Melody: a poem by William Wragg Smith.

1808 births
1875 deaths
Lawyers from Charleston, South Carolina
People from Dorchester County, South Carolina
American planters
19th-century American lawyers